Eki Igbinedion (born 4 August 1959) is the former First Lady of Edo State and wife of Lucky Igbinedion, the Former Governor of Edo State. Eki Igbinedion founded Idia Renaissance, a non governmental civil society organization based in Edo State, with the aim of combating human trafficking, including reception of victims of human trafficking.

Early life and education
Princess Eki Igbinedion was born into a royal family of Prince and Princess Oyemarense in Benin City, the capital city of Edo State. She attended Boston University, Massachusetts, in the United States of America where she obtained a bachelor's degree in economics.

Pet Projects 
Being the First Lady of Edo State, Eki Igbinedion undertook some pet projects to help the less privilege and also help solve some societal problems in the state. In 1999, she established the Idia Renaissance to help address the issue of sex and human trafficking in Edo State. She also founded the Edo Underprivileged Children Scholarship Trust Funds with the goal of providing scholarships to the less privilege in the state.

References

1959 births
Nigerian women activists
First Ladies of Nigeria
Boston University alumni
20th-century Nigerian women
21st-century Nigerian women
Living people